Anachemmis is a genus of North American false wolf spiders that was first described by Ralph Vary Chamberlin in 1919. It was briefly synonymized with Titiotus, but was reconfirmed as its own distinct genus in 1999.

Species
 it contains five species, found in Mexico and the United States:
Anachemmis aalbui Platnick & Ubick, 2005 – USA
Anachemmis beattyi Platnick & Ubick, 2005 – USA, Mexico
Anachemmis jungi Platnick & Ubick, 2005 – USA
Anachemmis linsdalei Platnick & Ubick, 2005 – USA
Anachemmis sober Chamberlin, 1919 (type) – USA
Formerly included
Anachemmis dolichopus Chamberlin, 1919 = Socalchemmis dolichopus

See also
 List of Zoropsidae species

References

Araneomorphae genera
Spiders of Mexico
Spiders of the United States
Zoropsidae